Igor Milanović (born 18 December 1965) is a Serbian professional water polo head coach and former player. He is considered one of the best water polo players of all time. Milanović had an illustrious professional career spanning twenty years.

Biography
Milanović was born in Belgrade, Serbia, SFR Yugoslavia. He played a total of 349 games for the Yugoslav national team, scoring 540 goals. As a player, he won numerous trophies: he was a two-time Olympic gold medalist, a two-time World Championship winner, European Championship winner, a two-time FINA Cup winner, and a three-time Euroleague Championship winner. He was given the honour to carry the national flag of FR Yugoslavia at the opening ceremony of the 1996 Summer Olympics in Atlanta, becoming the 18th water polo player to be a flag bearer at the opening and closing ceremonies of the Olympics. On 13 May 2006, he was inducted into the International Swimming Hall of Fame in Fort Lauderdale.

In June 2009, Milanović was named the head coach of Partizan Raiffeisen after Dejan Udovičić stepped down. In 2011 as a head coach of Partizan Raiffeisen, he won the Euroleague Championship.

Honours

As a coach
Partizan
 LEN Champions League: 2010–11
 LEN Super Cup: 2011
 Eurointer League: 2009–10, 2010–11
 Serbian Championship: 2009–10, 2010–11, 2011–12
 Serbian  Cup: 2009–10, 2010–11, 2011–12
 Tom Hoad Cup: 2011
Pro Recco
LEN Champions League: 2014–15
Serie A: 2014–15
Coppa Italia: 2014–15
Galatasaray
Turkish Championship: 2016–17
 Novi Beograd
LEN Champions League runners-up: 2021–22
 Adriatic League: 2021–22
 Serbian Championship: 2021–22
Olympiacos
Greek Cup: 2022–23

As a player
VK Partizan
 Yugoslavian Championship: 1983–84, 1986–87, 1987–88
 Yugoslavian Cup:  1981–82, 1984–85, 1986–87, 1987–88
 Mediterranean Cup: 1989
Mladost
 Yugoslavian Championship: 1989–90
 LEN Euroleague: 1989–90, 1990–91
 LEN SuperCup: 1990.
 Mediterranean Cup: 1991
VK Crvena Zvezda
 Yugoslavian Championship: 1991–92
CN Catalunya
 Spanish Championship: 1992–93
Roma
 LEN Trophy: 1993–94
PVK Budva
  Serbia and Montenegro Championship: 1993–94

See also
 Yugoslavia men's Olympic water polo team records and statistics
 Serbia and Montenegro men's Olympic water polo team records and statistics
 List of Olympic champions in men's water polo
 List of Olympic medalists in water polo (men)
 List of flag bearers for Serbia and Montenegro at the Olympics
 List of world champions in men's water polo
 List of World Aquatics Championships medalists in water polo
 List of members of the International Swimming Hall of Fame

References

External links
 

1965 births
Living people
Sportspeople from Belgrade
Yugoslav male water polo players
Serbian male water polo players
Serbian water polo coaches
Olympic water polo players of Yugoslavia
Serbian expatriate sportspeople in Croatia
Water polo players at the 1984 Summer Olympics
Water polo players at the 1988 Summer Olympics
Water polo players at the 1996 Summer Olympics
Olympic gold medalists for Yugoslavia
Olympic medalists in water polo
European champions for Yugoslavia
Medalists at the 1988 Summer Olympics
Medalists at the 1984 Summer Olympics
World Aquatics Championships medalists in water polo
Mediterranean Games silver medalists for Yugoslavia
Competitors at the 1991 Mediterranean Games
Universiade medalists in water polo
Mediterranean Games medalists in water polo
Universiade silver medalists for Yugoslavia
Universiade bronze medalists for Yugoslavia
Medalists at the 2011 Summer Universiade